93rd Infantry Division may refer to:

 93rd Infantry Division (United States)
 93rd Infantry Division (German Empire)
 93rd Infantry Division (Wehrmacht)